The canton of Muzillac is an administrative division of the Morbihan department, northwestern France. Its borders were modified at the French canton reorganisation which came into effect in March 2015. Its seat is in Muzillac.

It consists of the following communes:
 
Ambon
Arzal
Billiers
Camoël
Damgan
Férel
Le Guerno
Marzan
Muzillac
Nivillac
Noyal-Muzillac
Péaule
Pénestin
La Roche-Bernard
Saint-Dolay

References

Cantons of Morbihan